Bamsan was one of the 68 constituencies in the Himachal Pradesh Legislative Assembly of Himachal Pradesh a northern state of India. It was also part of Hamirpur, Himachal Pradesh Lok Sabha constituency.

Member of Legislative Assembly

Election results

2007

See also
 Hamirpur district, Himachal Pradesh
 List of constituencies of Himachal Pradesh Legislative Assembly

References

External links
HP official website of the Chief Electoral Officer

Former assembly constituencies of Himachal Pradesh
Hamirpur district, Himachal Pradesh